In mathematics, many logarithmic identities exist. The following is a compilation of the notable of these, many of which are used for computational purposes.

Trivial identities 

{| cellpadding=3
|  ||  because || 
|-
|  || because || 
|}

Explanations 

By definition, we know that:
,

Setting ,
we can see that: 
. So, substituting these values into the formula, we see that:

, which gets us the first property.

Setting ,
we can see that: 
. So, substituting these values into the formula, we see that:

, which gets us the second property.

Many mathematical identities are called  trivial , only because they are relatively simple (typically from the perspective of an experienced mathematician).
This is not to say that calling an identity or formula  trivial  means that it's not important.

Cancelling exponentials 

Logarithms and exponentials with the same base cancel each other. This is true because logarithms and exponentials are inverse operations—much like the same way multiplication and division are inverse operations, and addition and subtraction are inverse operations.

Both of the above are derived from the following two equations that define a logarithm:

, we get the following equation: 

, which gets us the first equation.
Another more rough way to think about it is that ,

Looking at the equation 

, which gets us the second equation.
Another more rough way to think about it is that ,

Using simpler operations 

Logarithms can be used to make calculations easier. For example, two numbers can be multiplied just by using a logarithm table and adding. These are often known as logarithmic properties, which are documented in the table below.

{| cellpadding=3
|  || because || 
|-
|  || because || 
|-
|  || because || 
|-
|  || because || 
|-
|  || because || 
|-
|  || because || 
|}

The laws result from canceling exponentials and the appropriate law of indices. Starting with the first law:

The law for powers exploits another of the laws of indices:

The law relating to quotients then follows:

Similarly, the root law is derived by rewriting the root as a reciprocal power:

Derivations of product, quotient, and power rules 

These are the three main logarithm laws/rules/principles, from which the other properties listed above can be proven. Each of these logarithm properties correspond to their respective exponent law, and their derivations/proofs will hinge on those facts. There are multiple ways to derive/prove each logarithm law – this is just one possible method.

Logarithm of a product 

To state the logarithm of a product law formally:

Derivation:

Let , where ,
and let . This can be done more easily by rewriting in terms of exponentials, whose properties we already know.

To recover the logarithms, we apply  to both sides of the equality.

The right side may be simplified using one of the logarithm properties from before: we know that , giving

This completes the derivation.

Logarithm of a quotient 

To state the logarithm of a quotient law formally:

Derivation:

Let , where ,
and let .

This can be done more easily by rewriting in terms of exponentials, whose properties we already know.

To recover the logarithms, we apply  to both sides of the equality.

The right side may be simplified using one of the logarithm properties from before: we know that , giving

This completes the derivation.

Logarithm of a power 

To state the logarithm of a power law formally,

Derivation:

Let , where , let , and let . For this derivation, we want to simplify the expression . To do this, we begin with the simpler expression . Since we will be using  often, we will define it as a new variable: Let .

To more easily manipulate the expression, we rewrite it as an exponential. By definition, so we have

Similar to the derivations above, we take advantage of another exponent law. In order to have  in our final expression, we raise both sides of the equality to the power of :

where we used the exponent law .

To recover the logarithms, we apply  to both sides of the equality.

The left side of the equality can be simplified using a logarithm law, which states that .

This completes the derivation.

Changing the base 

To state the change of base logarithm formula formally:

This identity is useful to evaluate logarithms on calculators. For instance, most calculators have buttons for ln and for log10, but not all calculators have buttons for the logarithm of an arbitrary base.

Proof/derivation 

Let , where  Let . They cannot be 1, because the logarithm function is not well defined for the base of 1. The number  will be what the logarithm is evaluating, so it must be a positive number. Since we will be dealing with the term  quite frequently, we define it as a new variable: Let .

To more easily manipulate the expression, it can be rewritten as an exponential.

Applying  to both sides of the equality,

Now, using the logarithm of a power property, which states that ,

Isolating , we get the following:

Resubstituting  back into the equation,

This completes the proof that .

This formula has several consequences:

where  is any permutation of the subscripts .  For example

Summation/subtraction 
The following summation/subtraction rule is especially useful in probability theory when one is dealing with a sum of log-probabilities:

Note that the subtraction identity is not defined if , since the logarithm of zero is not defined. Also note that, when programming,  and  may have to be switched on the right hand side of the equations if  to avoid losing the "1 +" due to rounding errors.  Many programming languages have a specific log1p(x) function that calculates  without underflow (when  is small).

More generally:

Exponents 
A useful identity involving exponents:

or more universally:

Other/resulting identities

Inequalities 
Based on, and 

Calculus identities

Limits 

The last limit is often summarized as "logarithms grow more slowly than any power or root of x".

Derivatives of logarithmic functions

Integral definition

Integrals of logarithmic functions 

To remember higher integrals, it is convenient to define

where  is the nth harmonic number:

Then

Approximating large numbers 

The identities of logarithms can be used to approximate large numbers. Note that , where a, b, and c are arbitrary constants. Suppose that one wants to approximate the 44th Mersenne prime, . We can then get .

Similarly, factorials can be approximated by summing the logarithms of the terms.

Complex logarithm identities 

The complex logarithm is the complex number analogue of the logarithm function. No single valued function on the complex plane can satisfy the normal rules for logarithms. However, a multivalued function can be defined which satisfies most of the identities. It is usual to consider this as a function defined on a Riemann surface. A single valued version, called the principal value of the logarithm, can be defined which is discontinuous on the negative x axis, and is equal to the multivalued version on a single branch cut.

Definitions 

In what follows, a capital first letter is used for the principal value of functions, and the lower case version is used for the multivalued function. The single valued version of definitions and identities is always given first, followed by a separate section for the multiple valued versions.

 is the standard natural logarithm of the real number .
It can be computed using .
 is the principal value of the complex logarithm function and has imaginary part in the range .

 is the set of complex numbers v which satisfy 
 is the set of possible values of the arg function applied to z.

When k is any integer:

Constants 

Principal value forms:

Multiple value forms, for any k an integer:

Summation 

Principal value forms:

Multiple value forms:

Powers 

A complex power of a complex number can have many possible values.

Principal value form:

Multiple value forms:

Where ,  are any integers:

See also

References

External links 

 Logarithm in Mathwords

Logarithms
Mathematical identities
Articles containing proofs